Thomas M. Carlson served in the California State Assembly for the 18th district from January 8, 1923 - January 5, 1925. During World War I he served in the United States Army.

Carlson also served as an Attorney.

References

United States Army personnel of World War I
Members of the California State Legislature